"The Man Who Never Forgot" is a science fiction short story by Robert Silverberg. It was first published in The Magazine of Fantasy & Science Fiction in February 1958.

Synopsis

Tom Niles has perfect memory of everything he has seen or heard since birth — which makes it nearly impossible for him to sustain any sort of relationship with anyone.

Reception

Damien Broderick has called it "pretty good early Silverberg", and considers that it is "shaped a lot like" Silverberg's 1972 novel Dying Inside — a similarity which has also been noted by Paul Kincaid.

Paul di Filippo observed that it "most vividly" depicts the disadvantages of "camera-perfect memory". Harlan Ellison declared that the story "spoke to the alienation with which we all suffer".

References

Short stories by Robert Silverberg
Works originally published in The Magazine of Fantasy & Science Fiction